Full list of compositions by Jacques Champion de Chambonnières (c. 1601/02 – 1672), French harpsichordist, dancer and composer.

Key to columns
 A. Edition gravée. Les Pieces de Clavessin de Monsieur de Chambonnieres. Se vendent à Paris chez Jollain rue St Jacques à la Ville de Cologne Auec privilège de Roy. 1670. Liure Premier. Liure Second.
 B. Manuscrit Bauyn. Bibliothèque nationale de Paris. Manuscrits de la Réserve Vm7 674 et 675.
 C. Bibliothèque Sainte-Geneviève de Paris. Manuscrit 2356.
 D. Bibliothèque Sainte-Geneviève de Paris. Manuscrit 2348.
 E. Bibliothèque du Conservatoire de Paris. Manuscrits de la Réserve 18223
 F. Bibliothèque du Conservatoire de Paris. Manuscrits sans cote (no barré 2389. Bibliothèque de l'Université de France).
 G. Bibliothèque de la ville de Versailles. Manuscrits 139 à 143.
 H. Hof und Staatsbibliothek de Munich. Manuscrit 1503.
 J. Library of Christ Church d'Oxford. Manuscrit 1236.

Compositions

References
 Œuvres complètes de Chambonnières, Paul Brunold, André Tessier, Paris 1925, 1967.

Chambonnieres, Jacques Champion de